Edland is a village in Vinje Municipality in Vestfold og Telemark county, Norway. The village is located where the rivers Bora and Kjela meet, just to the east of the village of Haukeli. The European route E134 highway runs through the village. Aasmund Olavsson Vinje took the plot of his epic poem about "Storegut" from Edland.

References

Vinje
Villages in Vestfold og Telemark